The Rental Health Index is an analytical tool created for property investors and others interested in real estate trends. The Index provides information on vacancy rates, rent changes, capitalization rates, appreciation and job growth for 75 US cities. Federal data helps determine where cities rank in terms of their property value. The city rankings allow investors to make informed decisions.

History 

The Rental Health Index was created by All Property Management in 2013. Information in the Index is updated quarterly using data from: the US Census Bureau, Department of Housing & Urban Development, CNN Money and Core Logic and the Bureau of Labor & Statistics.

Rental Health Index Initial Report Findings 

The first edition was released during the third quarter of 2013. Several newspapers used the Rental Health Index to cover local real estate trends.

The Bakersfield Californian found Bakersfield, California to be the second best city in which to invest in real estate property. The Albuquerque Journal reported Albuquerque as the third-best city.  The Worcester Business Journal Online reported Worcester as the number five city for investing in rental property.

References 

Residential real estate